Daphne acutiloba is a shrub, of the family Thymelaeaceae.  It is evergreen, and is found in China, specifically Hubei, Sichuan, and Yunnan.

Description
The shrub grows to a height of 0.5 to 2 m.  It grows small white flowers in clusters.  It is very similar to Daphne longilobata in appearance. It is found at altitudes ranging from 1400 to 3000 m.

References

acutiloba